The Enthroned Madonna and Child with Saints is a triptych painting in tempera and gold leaf on panel (159x198 cm) by Agnolo Gaddi.

It is dated 1375 and preserved in the Galleria nazionale di Parma.

References

Sources
 

1370s paintings
Collections of the Galleria nazionale di Parma
Paintings of Thomas Aquinas
Paintings depicting John the Baptist
Triptychs